Symphony of Silence; is a 2001 Armenian drama film directed by Vigen Chaldranyan. It was Armenia's submission to the 74th Academy Awards for the Academy Award for Best Foreign Language Film, but was not accepted as a nominee.

Main cast 
Michael Poghosian	
Karen Dzhanibekyan
Jean-Pierre Nshanian
Vladimir Msryan

See also

Cinema of Armenia
List of submissions to the 74th Academy Awards for Best Foreign Language Film

References

External links

2001 films
2001 drama films
Armenian drama films

Armenian-language films